Cangas del Narcea is the oldest municipality in the Principality of Asturias in Spain. It is also the largest municipality in Asturias.  It is in the southwest of Asturias, on the Asturian border with León. Formerly, Cangas del Narcea was known as Cangas de Tineo (Asturian: Cangas de Tinéu).
Cangas del Narcea is also the name of the municipality's capital, and one of the judicial districts in Asturias.

Geography

Parishes
Cangas del Narcea is divided into 54 parishes:

Protected areas
Muniellos Wood, a nature reserve which lies within Cangas del Narcea and Ibias, is the core area of the Muniellos Biosphere Reserve (designated by UNESCO in 2000 and later extended). In 2002 a new natural park was created, the  Natural Park of Fuentes del Narcea, Degaña, and Ibias (Parque Natural de Fuentes del Narcea, Degaña e Ibias), an area of 550 km² (212 sq mi). The natural park provides the core area of the biosphere reserve with a buffer zone. The park's formation prompted legal action by landowners, but a management plan for the protected area was approved in 2006.

The Muniellos Visitor Centre is in Cangas del Narcea

Politics

Demography

References

External links

Municipalities in Asturias